Sabine Tröger (born 7 June 1967) is a retired sprinter from Austria. She twice won a bronze medal in the 200 metres at the European Indoor Championships (1989, 1992). She also competed at the 1992 Olympic Games.

Her personal bests are 11.28 secs for 100 metres (1993) and 23.17 secs for 200 metres (1993). She was a member of the quartet that broke the Austrian record in 4 x 100 metres relay with 44.63 seconds in 1994. As of 2016, the record still stands.

Achievements

References

External links

1967 births
Living people
Austrian female sprinters
Athletes (track and field) at the 1992 Summer Olympics
Olympic athletes of Austria
World Athletics Championships athletes for Austria
Olympic female sprinters